Anthony Michael Brooks is an American speed cubing champion. He specializes in the 2x2 cube and classic 3x3 cube, and has been officially ranked in the top five in the world in both categories as recognized by the World Cube Association. Since learning to solve the cube in March 2008, Brooks has become known for developing advanced speedsolving methods as well as frequently promoting speedcubing in the media. While working as the Liberty Science Center's Speedcuber-in-Residence, Brooks set the Guinness World Record for most Rubik's Cubes solved underwater in a single breath, and also led the team that currently holds the world record for solving the Groovik's Cube, the world's largest functioning Rubik's Cube. In July 2017, Brooks was featured on the debut season of FOX's Superhuman TV show.

Appearances
Brooks has served as a performer at the World Science Festival and has twice performed on stage at the Liberty Science Center's annual Genius Award Gala for recipients and guests such as Bill Nye, David Blaine, Sir Richard Branson, Garry Kasparov, Susan Sarandon, and will.i.am. He also acted as the principal performer at the Beyond Rubik's Cube exhibition's world premiere.

Brooks has demonstrated speedcubing live on ABC, Bloomberg Television, CNN and NPR, and has been featured in segments aired on BBC, ESPN and NBC. He made his commercial debut in Volkswagen's "You Can't Fake Fast" ad campaign and his newspaper appearances include The New York Times, The Wall Street Journal, and New York Daily News. In July 2017, Brooks was featured on FOX's Superhuman TV show, in which he successfully solved 10 Rubik's Cubes in under two minutes.

Personal
A graduate of The Science Academy of South Texas, Brooks currently studies Economics and Business Administration at the University of Texas at Arlington. He has taught numerous people how to solve the Rubik's Cube, including his mother and younger brothers. His mother now holds the Jamaican national record for solving a Rubik's Cube, and his brother, Brian, is one of Texas' top ranked speed cubers. In January 2017, Brooks became the first speedcuber to win the main event of 50 World Cube Association competitions, which he described as completing a "personal goal."

Notable Results

Current Personal Bests in Competition

World Records

Former North American Records

World Championship Podiums

U.S. National Championship Podiums

External links
 Anthony Brooks' Speedcubing Website

References

Living people
American speedcubers
Year of birth missing (living people)